Tetracha rutilans is a species of tiger beetle that was described by Thomson in 1857.

References

Beetles described in 1857
Cicindelidae